is a 1989 Japanese animated science fiction film directed by Mamoru Oshii, with an original story by Headgear. It was produced by Bandai Visual, Tohokushinsha and animated by Studio Deen and I.G. Tatsunoko. It is part of the Patlabor series.

Plot
Set in 1999, Tokyo is undergoing a huge re-development program: old suburbs are being demolished and human-made islands are being constructed in Tokyo Bay under the Babylon Project. Dominating the scene is the Ark, a huge man-made island that serves at the Project's nerve center and chief Labor manufacturing facility.

However, several of the Labors being used in Tokyo, specifically those built by Shinohara Heavy Industries, suddenly go haywire even while unattended. The Tokyo Metropolitan Police Department's (TMPD) 2nd Special Vehicles Section (SV2) is assigned to help reel in the errant Labors, but only the SV2's Division II is on duty around the clock (with Division I already on training duties elsewhere). The JGSDF is also preoccupied as they send their own forces to stop an HOS-equipped TYPE-X10 Labor tank prototype.

As Division II goes out on the field, team commander Captain Gotoh, Sgt Asuma Shinohara, and mechanic Shige Shiba work with police Detective Matsui to find further leads on the case. They discover that all the errant Labors, plus other Labors in the Greater Tokyo Area, were equipped with the company's new Hyper Operating System (HOS). Low-frequency resonance emanating from wind-struck high-rise buildings triggers the erratic behavior in these units. To SV2 pilot Noa Izumi's relief, no copies of the software were installed in Division II's AV98 Ingram police Labors. They also learn that HOS programmer Eiichi Hoba, who had committed suicide days before, was obsessed with the Babylon Project's Biblical references (the Ark being alluded to Noah's Ark, for example; his own name. E. Hoba—Jehovah—for another) and planted a self replicating virus in the code that would cause Labors to malfunction. A computer simulation predicts that gale-force winds acting on the Ark could send all the Labors in Tokyo into a massive rampage, especially since the Ark's size and steel framework amplifies the resonance frequencies causing them to reach farther into the city. Worse, the weather bureau announces that a typhoon is expected to hit Tokyo within two days.

Gotoh discreetly gets clearance from the TMPD leadership to destroy the Ark as Shige tries to dig up more evidence of Hoba's guilt to justify the operation. Kanuka Clancy returns from the US to help in the raid. Division II attaches flotation bags to their vehicles and head out to the Ark. Malfunctioning HOS-equipped Labors engage the team as soon as they land on the Ark. Ingram pilots Noa and Ohta, plus Kanuka in a hijacked AV-X0 TYPE-0 police Labor prototype, buys time for Hiromi, Asuma and Shinshi to break into the control room and activate the Ark's self-destruct sequence. However, Kanuka loses control over the TYPE-0 in the chaos because it runs on HOS as well. Trapped by the TYPE-0 in one of the last remaining ledges, Noa climbs out of her damaged Ingram and fires her shotgun into the Labor’s S-RAM system to finally shut it down. With the successful destruction of the Ark, SV2 sends helicopters to rescue the team.

Development
The Biblical references in the movie were due to Oshii being inspired by Noa's name's similarity to Noah, and he reused some concepts from his cancelled Lupin the Third movie as a result, with the ark being the equivalent of the cancelled film's tower of Babel. The plotline involving the architect and mastermind having committed suicide before the start of the story was also taken from the cancelled film. Oshii also wanted to reuse part of the cancelled film's ending, but was stopped by other staff members such as Izubuchi. He would later go on to use that ending for the live action film THE NEXT GENERATION Patlabor: Shuto Kessen.

Voice actors

Home media
The first two Patlabor films have been released on DVD numerous times. The original release uses the same master as the Laserdisc release and offers stereo Japanese. The next release featured remastered non-anamorphic letterbox video. The original North American DVD release from Manga Entertainment featured a VHS transfer and the original MangaUK English dub. The third release, which the latest R1s from Bandai Visual use, features remastered anamorphic letterbox video and 5.1 sound. The US release features a new English dub produced by Bandai Visual. The Australian Madman/Manga UK R4 release uses the Australian Manga VHS master, and includes remixed 5.1 Manga UK dub and the original 2.0 Japanese dub. . In 2008, both movies were released in Japan on Blu-ray with English audio and English subtitles. It was licensed in Europe by Beez Entertainment. Section23 Films has licensed all three Patlabor films and the first film on Blu-ray and DVD was released on May 5, 2015.

Notes

References

External links
  
 
 
 
 

1989 anime films
1980s science fiction films
Bandai Visual
Films directed by Mamoru Oshii
Films set in 1999
Films set in Tokyo
Japanese science fiction films
1980s Japanese-language films
Maiden Japan
Manga Entertainment
Patlabor
Postcyberpunk films
Production I.G
Studio Deen
Films scored by Kenji Kawai